Safety practices generally recommend that chainsaw users wear protective clothing, also known as personal protective equipment or PPE, while operating chainsaws. There is general agreement worldwide on what clothing is suitable, but local jurisdictions have specific rules and recommendations.

Clothing

Helmet
The helmet offers some protection for the user's head against impact by the cutter bar of the chainsaw should a 'kickback' occur. Kickback is when the running chainsaw jumps up unexpectedly out of the cut, thus endangering the saw operator. 
Helmet protection can only be successful if the chain brake has been operated to stop the saw chain, since a chain running at full speed can easily cut into the helmet. The helmet, and its eye protection guard, also protect against impacts from small falling or flying objects, such as dead twigs and branches from a tree being felled.

Exposure to the sun causes the plastic of the helmet to weaken over time, so it is recommended that a helmet is replaced every 3–5 years. A helmet normally has a symbol inside that shows when it was made. Many helmets also now have a sticker on the outside that fades with exposure to light. When the sticker has faded the helmet should be replaced. 
Another way of determining if a helmet needs to be changed is to press the two sides of the helmet towards each other. If a cracking noise is heard, the helmet must be replaced.

In the EU, a helmet must meet the requirements of EN397. Helmets as well as other safety equipment in Germany must have the KWF sign.

Visor or goggles 
A visor or goggles reduce the chance of chips penetrating the user's eyes.

The relatively flimsy mesh visor, with imperfect coverage of the face, is considered acceptable because the chips produced by well-maintained chainsaws are of relatively uniform size and speed. Unlike other woodworking tools, a chainsaw with a sharp chain produces little or no sawdust, only chips (that are too large to fit through the visor's mesh).

Some chainsaw users prefer conventional safety glasses or goggles. The choice may depend on the environment. The visor provides better ventilation for hard work in hot weather. Often, both safety goggles and a visor are employed for superior protection.

In the EU, a visor must comply with EN1731, or glasses must comply with EN166.

Chainsaw safety mitt 
A leather mitt for the operator's left hand that is fitted to, but is free to rotate on, the front bar of the chainsaw.

The safety mitt ensures that if kickback occurs the operator's hand remains on the bar of the chainsaw. This means that the kickback is more easily controlled and the chain brake is more easily engaged. The safety mitt also protects the operator's left hand in the same way as chainsaw safety gloves. The protection on the left hand mitt protects when the chain derails and jumps over the front handle.

Most safety mitts have a protection class 0 (up to 16 m/s chain speed, see below). There are mitts available covering class 1 (20 m/s chain speed).

This section on safety mitts is now outdated.

Ear defenders 
Ear defenders and ear plugs attenuate noise to levels that cause little or no damage to the user's hearing. Non-electric chainsaws are very loud, typically 115 dB, above the recommended exposure limit of 85 dB from the National Institute for Occupational Safety and Health.

In the EU, ear defenders must comply with EN352-1.

Trousers (pants) 
Special fabrics have been developed for chainsaw clothing, and this development is still ongoing. Conventional fabric is useless as protection against a running chainsaw, as the fabric is cut through immediately.

There is a real struggle and conflict between making a fabric proof against more violent impact, and making it light, flexible and comfortable enough for the user. Clothes which make the user too hot, or which prevent the user moving easily, are a safety problem in themselves. A worker unable to move easily and/or suffering from being too hot is not safe. 
Extra fabric layers are added to clothing to improve cut resistance, but clothes which cannot be cut at all by a powerful saw are impractical, even with modern fibres. 
Additionally saw and chain technology seems to be outstripping fabric technology. 
It is very difficult to protect against high power saws employing aggressively cutting chains.

A classification scheme has been developed in the EU to rate trousers, and fabric in general, for protection against cutting.

The chain speed is specified in the manual for a chainsaw. Higher class trousers are more expensive, hotter, and heavier, so there is an advantage to choosing the trousers to match the saw.

There are two standard types of trousers, type A and type C. Type A protects only the front of the legs, and can be supplied as chaps, worn over conventional work clothes, or as conventional trousers. Type C gives protection all around the legs and are almost always worn as ordinary trousers, not over another garment. Chaps are generally used for occasional, farm or homeowner applications. Professional chainsaw operators would choose trousers for comfort and ease of movement, with fallers, ground workers and firewood cutters opting for class A trousers because of the low risk of being cut in the back of the leg. Climbers and tree surgeons would have to wear type C, as they will be cutting from a wider variety of positions. Type C trousers are, of course, highly insulating, and may lead to heat stress if worn for labour-intensive operations such as firewood cutting. 
Chainsaw protective fabric works on a number of principles. The outermost layer can be made both tough and slippery, to protect against minor damage which could compromise the filler material. Beneath this, long, loose fibres of polyester, Avertic, ballistic nylon or Kevlar are laid in layers. When a saw contacts the trousers, the outer layer is immediately cut through but the inner is drawn out and wraps around the saw's drive sprocket, locking it solid and halting the chain, limiting damage to the operator's leg. The length of the fabrics and number of layers match the safety class. In case of an accident the fabric is pulled out of the upper and lower seam and wrap around the sprocket as described above. Trousers should be slightly baggy, so that there is give, to prevent the chain pulling the operator's leg into the chainsaw. Instead the 'baggy' excess fabric is pulled out and into the chain mechanism, thereby stopping the saw. After stopping a saw, the damaged trousers must be scrapped, having done their job. 
The saw must be field-stripped to remove the fibres, and to allow it to run again.

If some trousers are washed the material inside may degrade over time. As a result, these trousers should be replaced, and not washed in hot water too frequently. If the trousers have Avertic as protection, they should be washed regularly to maintain its protective features. Likewise trousers should be free of rips and tears that may catch on a chain saw or timber when moving through a forest.

In case the trousers are damaged it is permissible to repair them only as long the inside protective fabric layers are not damaged. If they are damaged the trousers are no longer safe.
They must be discarded and a new pair obtained.

Chainsaw protective trousers in the EU must comply with EN ISO 11393-2:2018.

Jacket
Chainsaw protective jackets in the EU must comply with EN381-11.

For detailed information on fabric ratings, see the section above on trousers. The logic is much the same - the protective materials are designed to slow the chain's rate of cutting and clog the mechanism, rather than protect the wearer completely.

Gloves 

Chainsaw gloves have cut-proof fabric protection like that for trousers, but only on the back of the left hand. It's especially important that work gloves are flexible, which limits how much padding they can have. Experience has shown that most chainsaw injuries to the hands occur on the back of the left hand.

In the EU, chainsaw gloves must comply with EN381-7.

Boots 
Chainsaw boots are based on ordinary steel-toe boots, but have layers of chainsaw protective fabric on the exposed front surfaces. They are available in lace-up leather or rubber wellington boot versions.  Popular manufacturers of chainsaw boots sold in Europe include Haix, Klima-Air, Rock Fall, Meindl and Oregon.

Boots protect the operator from front and, to a certain extent, from sideways cuts.

In the EU, chainsaw boots must comply with EN345-2. These boots must be to the appropriate EN20345 standard for general safety footwear and must also be distinctively marked as suitable for chainsaw use, according to EN381-3

Protective chainsaw gaiters to EN381-9 over general steel-toe boots are acceptable for occasional users.

History 

In the early 1980s Kjell Eng, the founder of Engtex, got the idea to use textiles for protection and cut prevention. Having worked as a logger earlier in life, he was very aware of the danger in using and handling a chainsaw. The first generation of protective fabrics consisted of a multi-layered and specially designed tricot fabric that peeled off layer by layer at contact with the cutting chains. This was the start and the first-ever chainsaw protective fabric was born. Statistics showed a reduction in injuries at work-related accidents in forestry and logging. However the new fabrics did not stop the more severe accidents with deep cuts and lethal outcome.

In the mid-1980s, Kjell Eng introduced the second generation of chainsaw protection and Engtex was granted its first patent in 1989.

Development of a third generation protective fabrics started in 1992 under the name Avertic. By using a new combination of settings, materials and finishing, this new generation of protective textiles enhanced not only the washability of garments but also the level of protection compared to earlier generations. Thanks to Kjell Eng's innovative mind, Avertic chainsaw protective textiles are still used in chaps, trousers, boots, jackets and gloves around the world. In the spirit of Kjell Eng the manufacturers of PPE strive daily to invent better protection for workers in the forestry and logging industry.

Chainsaw logo 

In the EU, chainsaw trousers, boots and gloves (the items containing chainsaw protective fabric) must carry a special chainsaw logo. This shows that the fabric is of a type tested to protect properly, and also shows the class of protection, the rated maximum chain speed.

Additional personal protective equipment (PPE)

First aid kit 
In the UK and Germany, workers are required to carry a first aid kit containing at least a large wound dressing.

Whistle and cell phone 
In the UK, workers are recommended to carry a whistle to call for help if they are injured. Colleagues may be close by, but unable to hear shouts for help over the noise of a running chainsaw.

In Germany a "Hilfe im Wald" ("Help in the forest") app shows the next security point where ambulances have access. These safety points are numbered and visible by a pole with orange head and the number on. These numbers are known to ambulances.

See also 
Chainsaw safety features
Protective clothing

References

External links 

 CDC: Preventing Chain Saw Injuries During Tree Removal After a Disaster

Safety clothing
Logging
Safety clothing